Silia Martini (27 March 1908 - ?) was an Italian high jumper and basketball player.

Career

Athletics
Three-time in a row national champion at senior level in long jump from 1927 to 1929, she boasts also 2 caps in the Italy national athletics team in 1930.

Basketball
She was among the pioneers of the Italy women's national basketball team, with whom she played the first match, France-Italy 34-16, on April 13, 1930. She scored four points. She has won two championships with the Ginnastica Triestina.

National records
 High jump: 1.67 m ( Dalmine, 15 July 1928) holder until 5 October 1930

National titles
Italian Athletics Championships
High jump: 1927, 1928, 1929

See also
 Women's high jump Italian record progression

References

1908 births
Date of death missing
Place of death missing
Italian female high jumpers
Italian women's basketball players
Sportspeople from Trieste